Laura Gonzalez Escallon (born 6 October 1990) is a professional golfer from Belgium who has played on the LPGA Tour and the Symetra Tour.

Amateur career 
Gonzalez was a member of the Belgium National Team and won the 2008 Girls Amateur Championship. She represented Belgium at the Espirito Santo Trophy in 2008 and 2010, and the Continent of Europe at the 2009 Vagliano Trophy.

She attended Purdue University from 2009 to 2013, and graduated with a Bachelor of Science in mathematics. She played for the Purdue Boilermakers women's golf team and won four tournaments, and was named 2011–12 Big Ten Golfer of the Year.

Gonzalez reached the quarterfinals of the 2012 U.S. Women's Amateur, eliminated by eventual champion and world's top-ranked amateur, Lydia Ko. She was runner-up at the 2013 European Ladies Amateur Championship, three strokes behind Emily Kristine Pedersen.

Professional career 
Gonzalez joined the Symetra Tour in 2014 and finished 23rd on the money list, falling to 35th in 2015. In 2016, she picked up her first two professional wins, first at the FireKeepers Casino Hotel Championship in July, then at the PHC Classic in August. She finished fifth on the Symetra Tour money list to earn LPGA Tour membership for the 2017 season.

Her win at the FireKeepers Casino Hotel Championship also qualified Gonzalez for her first major, the 2016 Evian Championship, where she finished T55.

As a rookie in on the 2017 LPGA Tour, she made 17 cuts in 25 starts, with two top-10 finishes including a career-best T5 at the Manulife LPGA Classic. She finished sixth in the Rookie of the Year standings and 73rd on the money list.

In 2018, she missed most of the LPGA season due to injury and only played two events. Upon return from injury, she made only two cuts in 19 starts on the 2019 LPGA Tour.

Amateur wins
2008 Girls Amateur Championship, Belgian Girls' Championship
2009 German Ladies Amateur
2011 Dixie Amateur Championship, Landfall Tradition 
2012 Dixie Amateur Championship, Lady Jaguar Intercollegiate
2013 Belgian International Amateur Golf Championship

Source:

Professional wins (2)

Symetra Tour (2)

Results in LPGA majors

CUT = missed the half-way cut
"T" = tied

Team appearances
Amateur
European Girls' Team Championship (representing Belgium): 2004, 2006
European Ladies' Team Championship (representing Belgium): 2007, 2008, 2009, 2010, 2011, 2013
Vagliano Trophy (representing the Continent of Europe): 2009 (winners)
Espirito Santo Trophy (representing Belgium): 2008, 2010

References

External links

Belgian female golfers
Purdue Boilermakers women's golfers
LPGA Tour golfers
Sportspeople from Walloon Brabant
People from La Hulpe
1990 births
Living people